Hillier Nurseries is a horticultural business which was founded by Edwin Hillier in 1864 as a florist and plant nursery.  It expanded as a family business, especially when managed by grandson Harold Hillier, and is now the largest nursery of shrubs and trees in the UK.

References

 Garden centres
 Horticultural companies of the United Kingdom